The People's Alliance (PA) was a political alliance in Sri Lanka founded by former president Chandrika Kumaratunga in 1994, until it was dissolved in 2004. D. M. Jayaratne was the general secretary of the alliance.

The alliance consisted of the following parties:
 Sri Lanka Freedom Party
 Lanka Sama Samaja Party
 Communist Party of Sri Lanka
 Sri Lanka Mahajana Party
 Bahujana Nidahas Peramuna
 Desha Vimukthi Janatha Party
 Democratic United National Front

The PA was successful in the general elections of 1994 and 2000, as well as the presidential elections of 1994 and 1999. However, the alliance was defeated in the 2001 general elections. After the creation of the United People's Freedom Alliance in 2004, most members of the People's Alliance merged into the new alliance. The CPSL and LSSP threatened to reform the PA as a separate front, however, such alliance was never formed.

Electoral history

External links 
 

1994 establishments in Sri Lanka
2004 disestablishments in Sri Lanka
Defunct political party alliances in Sri Lanka
Political parties established in 1994
Political parties disestablished in 2004
Political parties in Sri Lanka